Eccoptochile is an extinct genus of trilobite in the order Phacopida. It contains one species, E. clavigera.

External links
 Eccoptochile at the Paleobiology Database

Cheiruridae
Phacopida genera
Ordovician trilobites of Europe
Fossils of the Czech Republic
Letná Formation